David Moss Goldsmith (27 July 1931 – 25 June 2017) was a New Zealand field hockey player. He represented New Zealand in field hockey at the 1956 Olympic Games in Melbourne.

Goldsmith attended Christchurch Boys High School  and  graduated from Canterbury University College with an MSc with third-class honours in 1954.

References

External links

1931 births
2017 deaths
Field hockey players from Christchurch
New Zealand male field hockey players
Olympic field hockey players of New Zealand
Field hockey players at the 1956 Summer Olympics
University of Canterbury alumni
People educated at Christchurch Boys' High School